The Migu Music Awards is a music awards founded by China Mobile to recognize most popular music artists and works based on the statistics of Chinese music streaming service Migu Music.

Ceremonies

Categories
2017 Migu Music Awards
 Album of the Year
 Best Male Singer
 Best Female Singer
 Best Ringback Music Selling Singer
 Most Popular Male Singer (Hong Kong/Taiwan)
 Most Popular Female Singer (Hong Kong/Taiwan)
 Most Popular Male Singer (Mainland China)
 Most Popular Female Singer (Mainland China)
 Most Popular Group
 Most Popular Singer-Songwriter
 Most Popular Stage Performance
 Most Improved Singer
 Most Improved Group
 Most Breakthrough Singer
 Most Appealing Singer
 Most Appealing Group
 Viewer's Choice Male Singer
 Viewer's Choice Female Singer
 Top 10 Songs of the Year

References

2007 establishments in China
Annual events in China
Awards established in 2007
Chinese music awards
Recurring events established in 2007